The tangerine is a type of citrus fruit that is orange in color. Its scientific name varies. It has been treated as a separate species under the name Citrus tangerina or Citrus × tangerina, or treated as a variety of either Citrus reticulata, the mandarin orange, or Citrus × aurantium, the bitter orange. Citrus tangerina is also treated as a synonym of Citrus deliciosa. It is a group of orange-colored citrus fruit consisting of hybrids of mandarin orange varieties, with some pomelo contribution.

The name was first used for fruit coming from Tangier, Morocco, described as a mandarin variety. Under the Tanaka classification system, Citrus tangerina is considered a separate species. Under the Swingle system, tangerines are considered a group of mandarin (C. reticulata) varieties. Some differ only in disease resistance.  The term is also currently applied to any reddish-orange mandarin (and, in some jurisdictions, mandarin-like hybrids, including some tangors).

Tangerines are smaller and less rounded than the oranges. The taste is considered less sour, as well as sweeter and stronger, than that of an orange. A ripe tangerine is firm to slightly soft, and pebbly-skinned with no deep grooves, as well as orange in color. The peel is thin, with little bitter white mesocarp. All of these traits are shared by mandarins generally.

Peak tangerine season lasts from autumn to spring. Tangerines are most commonly peeled and eaten by hand. The fresh fruit is also used in salads, desserts and main dishes. The peel is used fresh or dried as a spice or zest for baking and drinks. Fresh tangerine juice and frozen juice concentrate are commonly available in the United States.

Etymology
According to the Oxford English Dictionary (OED), the word "tangerine" was originally an adjective meaning "Of or pertaining to, or native of Tangier, a seaport in Morocco, on the Strait of Gibraltar" and "a native of Tangier." The OED cites this usage from Addison's The Tatler in 1710 with similar uses from the 1800s. The adjective was applied to the fruit, once known scientifically as "Citrus nobilis var. tangeriana" which grew in the region of Tangiers. This usage appears in the 1800s.

Nomenclature and varieties 

Tangerines were first grown and cultivated as a distinct crop in the Americas by a Major Atway in Palatka, Florida. Atway was said to have imported them from Morocco (more specifically its third-largest city Tangier), which was the origin of the name. Major Atway sold his groves to N. H. Moragne in 1843, giving the Moragne tangerine the other part of its name.

The Moragne tangerine produced a seedling which became one of the oldest and most popular American varieties, the Dancy tangerine (zipper-skin tangerine, kid-glove orange). Genetic analysis has shown the parents of the Dancy to have been two mandarin orange hybrids each with a small pomelo contribution, a Ponkan mandarin orange and a second unidentified mandarin. The Dancy is no longer widely commercially grown; it is too delicate to handle and ship well, it is susceptible to Alternaria fungus, and it bears more heavily in alternate years. Dancys are still grown for personal consumption, and many hybrids of the Dancy are grown commercially.

Until the 1970s, the Dancy was the most widely grown tangerine in the US; the popularity of the fruit led to the term "tangerine" being broadly applied as a marketing name. Florida classifies tangerine-like hybrid fruits as tangerines for the purposes of sale and regulation; this classification is widely used but regarded as technically inaccurate in the industry. Among the most important tangerine hybrids of Florida are murcotts (a late-fruiting type of tangor marketed as "honey tangerine") and Sunbursts (an early-fruiting complex tangerine-orange-grapefruit hybrid). The fallglo, also a three-way hybrid ( tangerine,  orange and  grapefruit), is also grown.

Production
In 2021, world production of tangerines (including mandarins and clementines) was 42 million tonnes, led by China with 60% of the total (table).

Nutrition 

Tangerines contain 85% water, 13% carbohydrates, and negligible amounts of fat and protein (table). Among micronutrients, only vitamin C is in significant content (32% of the Daily Value) in a  reference serving, with all other nutrients in low amounts.

References

External links 

Citrus
Citrus hybrids
Crops

et:Tangeriin